The Wahala Cemetery is a cemetery near Atakpame in Togo. The cemetery contains a single Commonwealth War Graves Commission (CWGC) gravestone, that of Lieutenant George Masterman Thompson of the 1st Battalion Royal Scots. Thompson's death in the Togoland Campaign made him the first British officer killed in the First World War. Thompson was killed on 22 August 1914 aged 24 while trying to storm the German trenches while in command of French Senegalese troops at Chra Village. He was posthumously awarded the Croix de Guerre with Palms.

A film about the cemetery, A Place Called Wahala was made in 2021, directed by Jürgen Ellinghaus. It covers the annual Armistice Day commemoration at the cemetery.

References

External links
 
 

Cemeteries in Togo
Buildings and structures in Togo
Commonwealth War Graves Commission cemeteries in Togo
Tourist attractions in Togo
World War I cemeteries